Loskop Commando was a light infantry regiment of the South African Army. It formed part of the South African Army Infantry Formation as well as the South African Territorial Reserve.

History

Origin
The commando drew its manpower from the farmers using an irrigation scheme around the Loskop dam.

Operations

With the SADF
During this era, the unit was mainly used for area force protection, search and cordons as well as stock theft control assistance to the rural police.

The unit resorted under the command of the SADF's Group 33.

With the SANDF

Disbandment
This unit, along with all other Commando units was disbanded after a decision by South African President Thabo Mbeki to disband all Commando Units. The Commando system was phased out between 2003 and 2008 "because of the role it played in the apartheid era", according to the Minister of Safety and Security Charles Nqakula.

Unit Insignia

Leadership

See also 

 South African Commando System

References

Infantry regiments of South Africa
South African Commando Units